Primecoin (Abbreviation: XPM; sign: Ψ) is a cryptocurrency that implements a proof-of-work system that searches for chains of prime numbers.

History 
Primecoin was launched in 2013 by Sunny King, who also founded peercoin.

Unlike other cryptocurrencies, which are mined using algorithms that solved mathematical problems with no extrinsic value, mining Primecoin involves producing chains of prime numbers (Cunningham and bi-twin chains). These are useful to scientists and mathematicians and meet the requirements for a proof of work system of being hard to compute but easy to verify and having an adjustable difficulty.

Shortly after its launch, some trade journals reported that the rush of over 18,000 new users seeking to mine Primecoin overwhelmed providers of dedicated servers.

Primecoin has a block time of one minute, changes difficulty every block, and has a block reward that is a function of the difficulty.

References

Further reading

External links 
 

Cryptocurrency projects
Prime numbers
Currencies introduced in 2013